Wielka Lipa  is a village in the administrative district of Gmina Oborniki Śląskie, within Trzebnica County, Lower Silesian Voivodeship, in south-western Poland.

Notable residents
 Hans Karl von Diebitsch (1785–1831), Fieldmarshal

References

Wielka Lipa